Mega is the second full-length album released by electronic rock band Yacht. It was released on States Rights Records in 2005. The last track is a remix of the song "Now It Is All Over Like the Birds" by Thanksgiving.

Track listing
"Hello? Hello?" – 0:09
"Totally Stoked (On You)" – 3:39
"Hot Dog" (Iron Cobra version) – 1:29
"Roar" (Opps version) – 1:22
"I Love a Computer" (Anacortes version) – 1:54
"Dans Denmark" (2005 version) – 2:42
"Moot Point" – 1:04
"I Fought with My Friend (Call Back)" – 2:14
"Why Do Trucks? Etc." – 0:24
"Daydreams with Daffodils" – 0:55
"Vacationland Guitaroo" – 2:23
"Possessive" – 0:33
"Night Terrors" (grunge version) – 1:28
"DC November 2003" – 0:44
"Now It Is All Over Like the Birds" (Thanksgiving remix version) – 1:52

References 

2005 albums
Yacht (band) albums
States Rights Records albums